Eric Obinna Chukwunyelu  (born 10 June 1981) is a French-Nigerian former professional footballer who played as a striker.

Club career
Obinna was born in Owerri, Nigeria.

Obinna played in Reading's record-breaking promotion season. He did not score in six substitute appearances, but set up several goals.

Honours

Étoile FC
 2010 Singapore League Cup

References

External links
 BoroGuide
 
 
 
 

1981 births
Living people
People from Owerri
Association football forwards
Nigerian footballers
French footballers
Nigerian expatriate footballers
Ligue 2 players
AS Saint-Étienne players
Red Star F.C. players
FC Rouen players
Reading F.C. players
Stevenage F.C. players
A.S.D. Cassino Calcio 1924 players
Daejeon Hana Citizen FC players
Nigerian expatriate sportspeople in South Korea
Expatriate footballers in South Korea
Expatriate footballers in Malta
Expatriate footballers in Germany
People with acquired French citizenship
French people of Nigerian descent
Étoile FC players
Sportspeople from Imo State